Stigmella minusculella is a moth of the family Nepticulidae. It is found from Denmark and Latvia to the Pyrenees, Corsica, Italy and Crete, and from Great Britain to Ukraine. It is also present in North America, where it is found in Ohio, New Jersey and Ontario.

The wingspan is 5–6 mm. There are two to three generations per year.

The larvae feed on Pyrus amygdaliformis, Pyrus communis, Pyrus elaeagrifolia and Pyrus spinosa. They mine the leaves of their host plant. The mine consists of a slightly contorted corridor, usually not forming a secondary blotch. The frass line is very narrow, especially in the first section of the mine.

External links
Fauna Europaea
bladmineerders.nl
A taxonomic revision of the North American species of Stigmella (Lepidoptera: Nepticulidae)

Nepticulidae
Moths of Europe
Moths of North America
Moths described in 1855